The Ukrainian Air Force is the air force of Ukraine and one of the five branches of the Armed Forces of Ukraine. Its headquarters are in the city of Vinnytsia. When the Soviet Union dissolved in 1991, many aircraft were left in Ukrainian territory. Ever since, the Ukrainian Air Force has been downsizing and upgrading its forces. The main inventory of the air force still consists of Soviet-made aircraft. As of 2007, 36,300 personnel and 225 aircraft were in service in the Ukrainian Air Force and Air Defense forces.

Since Ukrainian independence in 1991, the air force has suffered from chronic underinvestment, leading to the bulk of its inventory becoming mothballed or otherwise inoperable. Despite this, Ukraine still possesses the world's 27th largest air force and the seventh largest air force in Europe, largely due to the ability of its domestic defense industry Ukroboronprom and its Antonov subsidiary to maintain its older aircraft.

The Ukrainian Air Force participated in the war in Donbas. Following the 5 September 2014 ceasefire, the air force was suspended from carrying out missions in the contested areas of Donbas. Since February 2022, the Air Force has been engaged in constant combat operations in the face of the 2022 Russian invasion of Ukraine.

Missions
The role of the Air Force is to protect the air space of Ukraine. The objectives are: obtaining operational air superiority, delivering air strikes against enemy units and facilities, covering troops against enemy air strikes, providing air support to Ukrainian Ground Forces and the Navy, disrupting enemy military and state management, disrupting enemy communications, and providing air support by reconnaissance, air drops, and troops and cargo transportation.

In peace-time, this is carried out by flying air-space control missions over the entire territory of Ukraine (603,700 square km), and by preventing air space intrusion along the aerial borders (totaling almost 7,000 km, including 5,600 km of land and 1,400 km of sea). Over 2,200 service personnel and civilian employees of the Air Force, employing 400 items of weapons and equipment, are summoned daily to perform defense duties.

On average, the Ukrainian radar forces detect and track more than 1,000 targets daily. As a result, in 2006 two illegal crossings of the state border were prevented and 28 violations of Ukrainian air space were prevented. Due to such increased strengthening of air space control, the number of air space violations decreased by 35% compared to the previous year, even though the amount of air traffic increased by 30%.

History

1917–1921 

The roots of Ukrainian military aviation are in the autumn 1917 creation of the Ukrainian People's Republic Air Fleet, headed by former commander of the Kyiv Military District Lieutenant Colonel Viktor Pavlenko. Previously, while in Russian service in World War I, Pavlenko was in charge of air security of the Russian Stavka.

Sometimes in 1918 the West Ukrainian People's Republic created its own aviation corps with the Ukrainian Galician Army headed by Petro Franko, a son of renowned Ukrainian writer Ivan Franko. In 1918 he organized an aviation school of the Ukrainian Galician Army Command Center which was active until 1920.

Among the airplanes used by the Ukrainian aviation in this period were Belgium-built SPAD S.VIIs. The Ukrainian Galician Army used Nieuport 17 biplanes.

Collapse of the USSR

Air Forces 
The Ukrainian Air Force was established on 17 March 1992, in accordance with a Directive of the General Staff Chief of the Armed Forces. The headquarters of the 24th Air Army of the Soviet Air Force in Vinnytsia served as the basis to create the Air Force headquarters. Also present on Ukrainian soil were units of the former Soviet 5th, 14th, and 17th Air Armies, plus five regiments (185th, 251st, 260th, 341st Heavy Bomber Aviation Regiments and 199th Reconnaissance Aviation Regiment) of the 46th Air Army, Long Range Aviation. In addition, the 161st Maritime Fighter Aviation Regiment, at Limanske in Odessa Oblast, came under Ukrainian control. It had formerly been part of the 119th Maritime Fighter Aviation Division of the Black Sea Fleet.

The new Air Force inherited the 184th Guards Heavy Bomber Aviation Regiment (201st Heavy Bomber Aviation Division) of Tupolev Tu-160 'Blackjack' which were based at Pryluky. Discussions with Russia concerning their return bogged down. The main bone of contention was the price. While Russian experts, who examined the aircraft at Pryluky in 1993 and 1996, assessed their technical condition as good, the price of $3 billion demanded by Ukraine was unacceptable. The negotiations led to nowhere and in April 1998, Ukraine decided to commence scrapping the aircraft under the Nunn-Lugar Cooperative Threat Reduction Agreement. In November, the first Tu-160 was ostentatiously chopped up at Pryluky.

In April 1999, immediately after NATO began air attacks against Serbia, Russia resumed talks with Ukraine about the strategic bombers. This time they proposed buying back eight Tu-160s and three Tu-95MS models manufactured in 1991 (those in the best technical condition), as well as 575 Kh-55MS missiles. An agreement was eventually reached and a contract valued at $285 million was signed. That figure was to be deducted from Ukraine's debt for natural gas. A group of Russian military experts went to Ukraine on 20 October 1999 to prepare the aircraft for the trip to Engels-2 air base. Between November 1999 and February 2001 the aircraft were transferred to Engels. One Tu-160 remains on display in Poltava.

Ukraine also had Tupolev Tu-22s, Tupolev Tu-22Ms and Tupolev Tu-95s for a period after the collapse of the Soviet Union. The 106th Heavy Bomber Aviation Division, part of the 37th Air Army operated some of them. However, these have all been scrapped, apart from a handful displayed in museums. TU-16 and TU-22M bombers were among the aircraft destroyed under the Conventional Forces in Europe treaty. It has been reported that Tu-16s based with the 251st Heavy Bomber Aviation Regiment at Belaya Tserkov were dismantled in 1993. By 1995, the IISS Military Balance 1995/96 listed no Tu-22 Blinders in service, though a listing for one division HQ and two regiments of Tu-22M Backfires remained in the Military Balance from 1995/96 to 2000/01.

From 24 January 1992, after the collapse of the USSR, 28th Air Defense Corps, previously subordinate to 2nd Air Defence Army was transferred under the 8th Air Defence Army of Ukraine. Units stationed in Moldova were transferred to the Moldovan Armed Forces (275th Guards Anti-Aircraft Rocket Brigade, battalions and companies from the 14th Radio-Technical Brigade). There were about 67,000 air defense troops in 1992. The headquarters of the Ukrainian Air Defence Forces was formed on the basis of HQ 8th Air Defence Army.

There were also three air defence corps: the 28th (Lviv), 49th (Odessa), and 60th (Dnipropetrovsk). Holm reports that all three air defence corps were taken over by Ukraine on 1 February 1992, and that the 28th ADC became the Western AD Region on 1 June 1992. The first issue of the Military Balance after the Soviet collapse, 1992–93, listed one Air Defence army, 270 combat aircraft, and seven regiments of Su-15s (80), MiG-23s (110) and MiG-25s (80).

By March 1994 Air Forces Monthly reported three air defence regions: the Southern with the 62nd and 737th Fighter Aviation Regiments, the Western with the 92nd (transferred from 14th Air Army and based at Mukachevo), 179th, and 894th Fighter Aviation Regiments (from 28th AD Corps/2nd Air Defence Army), and the Central with the 146th (Vasilkov), 636th (Kramatorsk, seemingly disbanded 1996 and its Su-15s broken up for scrap), and 933rd Fighter Aviation Regiments. The Military Balance 95/96 said that six fighter regiments had been disbanded. (p. 71)

In March 1994 the 14th Air Army became the 14th Air Corps, and on 18 March 1994 the 5th Air Army was redesignated the 5th Air Corps. The two air corps remained active in 1996: the 14th in the Carpathian MD and the 5th in the Odessa MD, which by that time incorporated the former Kyiv MD area. The long-range bomber division at Poltava was still operational, reporting directly to Air Force headquarters. This division headquarters was probably the 13th Guards Heavy Bomber Aviation Division.

Air Defence Forces 
The Soviet Army kept the forces dedicated to national air defence (Soviet Air Defence Forces) independent from and equal in status to the Soviet Air Forces. The units dedicated to the air defence of the ground formations were also kept separate from the Air Defence Forces and integrated into the Ground Forces. During the Soviet period the air defence of the Ukrainian SSR was provided as follows:
 28th Corps of Air Defence (HQ in Lviv), part of the 2nd Separate Army of Air Defence (HQ in Minsk, Byelorussian SSR) provided air defence umbrella over the western parts of the country;
 49th Volgogradskiy Red Banner Corps of Air Defence (HQ in Dnipropetrovsk), part of the 8th Separate Army of Air Defence (HQ in Kyiv) provided air defence umbrella over the central and eastern parts of the country;
 60th Red Banner Corps of Air Defence (HQ in Odessa), part of the 8th Separate Army of Air Defence (HQ in Kyiv) provided air defence umbrella over the southern parts of the country.

In 1992 the newly independent Ukrainian State took over control over the three AD corps and retained the Ukrainian Air Defence Forces as a separate armed service, equal in status to the Ground Forces, Air Forces and the Navy. The 8th Separate Army of Air Defence was redesignated as the Air Defence Forces of Ukraine (Вiйська Противоповiтряної оборони України) and the 28th Corps AD was subordinated to it. The ADTU existed as a separate service from 1992 to 2004, when they were merged with the Air Forces of Ukraine (literally Military Aviation Forces or Вiйськово-Повiтрянi Сили) to form the present-day unified Air Force of the Armed Forces of Ukraine (Повiтрянi Сили Збройних Сил України).

1991–2014
Since 1991's Ukrainian independence the Air Force has suffered from chronic underinvestment, leading to the bulk of its inventory becoming mothballed or otherwise becoming inoperable.

The structural reorganization of the Air Force had set as goals for itself the sufficient reduction in the total number of command and control levels, and increasing the efficiency of command and control processes. The reorganization of command and control elements of the air force is still underway. The first step of this organization was to transition from the existing air commands to the Command and Control and warning center systems.

This will not only help eliminate duplications at the command and control levels, but will also contribute to an increased centralization of the command and control system, the multi-functionality of the command and control elements, and effectiveness of response to the change of air conditions. 2006 saw the definition of the functions and tasks, organization and work of the C2 and Warning Center as well as the mechanism of interaction with the establishment of the Air Operations Center and Joint Operational Command. During the command and staff exercise one of the Air Force Commands has in effect performed control of "C2 and Warning Center – formation (unit)" level.

The An-24 and An-26 aircraft, as well as the S-300 and Buk M1 anti-aircraft systems, have been continually modernized, and their service life has been extended. An organizational basis and technological means for modernizing MiG-29, Su-24, Su-25, Su-27, L-39 has been produced. Given sufficient funding from the Verkhovna Rada, the Defense Industrial Complex of Ukraine, in cooperation with foreign companies and manufacturers, is capable of fully renewing the aircraft arsenal of the Ukrainian armed forces.

In 2005, the UAF was planning to restructure in an effort to improve efficiency. Ukraine was planning to put more advanced jet aircraft into service. Possibly buying newer SU-27s and MiG-29s from Russia. The plans were, that from approximately 2012, Ukraine would have to either take bold steps to create a new combat aircraft or purchase many existing combat aircraft. Due to the lack of funding, technical modernization was continually postponed. The Ukrainian air-force continued to use armament and military equipment which functioned mainly thanks to so-called ‘cannibalization’ (obtaining spare parts from other units), thus gradually depleting their total capabilities. Faced with the threat of losing military capability, initiating the process of technical modernization became a necessity.

In 2006, many aging weapons and equipment were decommissioned from combat service by the Air Force. This presented an opportunity to use the released funds to the modernization of various items of aviation and anti-aircraft artillery weapons and equipment, radio communication equipment, and flight maintenance equipment, as well as an improvement of Air Force personnel training.

In 2011 International Institute for Strategic Studies estimates that Ukraine's Air Force includes one Sukhoi Su-24M regiment, 5 regiments with Mikoyan MiG-29s and Sukhoi Su-27, one regiment with Sukhoi Su-25, two squadrons with Sukhoi Su-24MR, three transport regiments, some support helicopter squadrons, one helicopter training regiment, and some air training squadrons with L-39 Albatros. The IISS said they were grouped into the 5th and 14th Aviation Corps, the 35th Aviation Group, which is a multi-role rapid reaction formation, and a training aviation command. The IISS assesses the overall force size as 817 aircraft of all types and 43,100 personnel. The aviation corps had actually be reorganised into regional air commands in about 2004. Russian sources list three aviation groups (West, South, and Center).

The automated systems of collection, processing and transmission of radio information have been adopted as a component part of the Automated Command and Control System for aviation and air defense. Operational service testing of the circular surveillance radar station has also been completed. Prototypes of high-precision weapons systems, electronic warfare devices, and navigation equipment have been created and developed for state testing.

Role in the 2014 Russian invasion of Ukraine

Following the Revolution of Dignity and subsequent March 2014 Russian annexation of Crimea and the following violence and insurgency in east Ukraine, Ukraine tried to increase its defence spending and capabilities - with returning equipment to service being a key part of the spending drive.

During the 2014 Russian invasion of Crimea the air force did not fight but lost several aircraft to Russia; most were returned to Ukraine. The air force has taken part in the conflict against the 2014 insurgency in Donbas. During this conflict it has lost several planes and helicopters. Wall Street Journal published USA embassy in Kyiv report that Ukraine lost 19 planes and helicopters in the period 22 April - 22 July 2014. According to an unverified October 2015 report by Swiss technology company RUAG the Air Force had lost nearly half of its (combat) aircraft (since early 2014). RUAG believed that 222 of the Air Force's 400 aircraft had been lost.

Since 12 July 2014 the Ukrainian Air Force has been put on full combat alert. Around this date the Air Forces started restoring its former military airfields in Voznesensk, Buyalyk and Chervonohlynske (both in Odessa Oblast).

Ukraine inherited a large inventory of aircraft from the Soviet Union, these were mostly decommissioned and stored as the nation had little use or funding to keep a large fleet active. In 2014, the air force announced that it will be bringing back 68 aircraft that have been in reserve since the collapse of the Soviet Union, including the Tupolev Tu-141 reconnaissance drone. In April 2014 two MiG-29 aircraft were restored. In August a decommissioned An-26 transport aircraft was also restored to active service by a volunteer group. On 5 January 2015 the air force received another 4 newly restored airplanes, two MiG-29s and two Su-27s, as well as two Mi-8 and Mi-2 helicopters.

As a result of the war in Donbas the government of Ukraine has realized the importance of drone surveillance in locating enemy troops and recommissioned 68 Soviet era Tu-141 drones to be repaired. Analysts point out that despite being designed in 1979 the Tu-141 has a powerful camera, it likely uses similar airborne radar and infrared sensor as the Soviet-era Su-24 which would make it prone to jamming by Russian forces as they use the same equipment.

A crowd funding project for a "people's drone" was also conducted. The goal was to collect funds to purchase an already functioning American or Israeli drone. However, Ukrainian designers and engineers were able to build their own model based on the commercially available DJI Phantom 2 drone.

In October 2014, students from Ivano-Frankivsk designed their own drone to be used in the war in Donbas. The newly build drone has the ability to broadcast footage live, unlike the Tu-141 which relies on film that must be recovered. The drone was built from off the shelf components and funded by volunteers. The drone was also stated to have an operational ceiling of 7,000 meters, a range of 25 kilometers, and cost about US$4,000 to build.

Ukroboronprom has received an order for ₴2.5 million ($166,000) to refit several Mil Mi-24 helicopter gunships part of which included fitting them with night vision capabilities. The Mi-24 proved to be highly vulnerable to Russian separatist attacks during the 2014 Russian military intervention in Ukraine. With the exception of captured aircraft in Crimean airbases the Mi-24 had the highest loss rate of all aircraft in Ukraine's inventory, with 5 being shot down and 4 damaged during the conflict.

Developments towards restoration
 Starting in 1993 the United States National Guard worked with the Ukrainian Air Force as part of a NATO sponsored program. The Ukrainian Air Force worked with the California Air National Guard's 144th Fighter Wing. During which time the National Guard pilots worked with Ukrainian pilots during various joint exercises including in 2011 and 2018. 
 On 19 March 2014 repaired L-39 were transferred to the 203rd Training Aviation Brigade.
 On 4 April 2014 a single repaired MiG-29 is transferred to the 114th Tactical Aviation Brigade.
 On 29 May 2014 a decision is taken to consolidate all MiG-29 repair the Lviv Aviacon Plant.
 On 6 July 2014 a repaired Buk-M1 is transferred to the Air Defense Forces.
 On 31 July 2014 a single repaired MiG-29 is transferred to the 40th Tactical Aviation Brigade.
 On 5 August 2014 an order No. 499 was issued allocating finances to modernize all Su-27 to the Su-27B1M, Su-27P1M, Su-27S1M.
 On 30 August 2014 a single repaired An-26 is transferred to the 15th Transport Aviation Brigade.
 On 3 October 2014 Kanatovo Air Base in the Kirovograd Oblast is brought back to life.
 There were plans to begin licensed production of the Saab JAS 39 Gripen fighter in Lviv. However, these plans have stalled since 2014.

Russo-Ukrainian War 

On Thursday, 24 February 2022, the Air Force began to respond to the advance of Russian Aerospace Forces aircraft and materiel towards Ukrainian skies as part of the country's invasion by the Russian Armed Forces.

The Russian Defence Ministry has claimed that over 100 air defence systems and over 90 aircraft have been disabled or destroyed as of 6 March 2022. No official figures from the Ukrainian Defence Ministry were immediately available. According to US defense officials, UKAF still has 56 operational fighter jets as of 11 March 2022.

In April 2022, an unspecified country has offered parts to help Ukraine restore 20 aircraft to operational usage, US defence official claimed.

On 19 September, US Air Force General James B. Hecker said that Russia has lost 55 military aircraft due to being shot down by Ukrainian air defences since the start of the invasion. He credits this success to the Ukrainian use of SA-11 and SA-10 air defence systems. As the US doesn't have these systems getting new missiles from European allies is a "big ask" from Kyiv. Russian airplanes have increased their operations due to the 2022 Ukrainian Kharkiv Oblast counteroffensive. The tally went to 55 after the UK MoD stated that it believed that some 4 Russian jets had been downed by Ukraine over the last 10 days. This was due to a number of factors including changing front lines, or the fact that they were under pressure to provide closer ground support. He further claimed that Ukrainian Air Force is at "about 80%" of its pre-invasion strength after 7 months of combat.

Equipment 
As part of ongoing 2022 Russo-Ukrainian War, the following numbers may be outdated. Last reliable information of the number of Ukrainian Airforce operational aircraft came from December 2021; during the ongoing conflict, losses and technical reffiting and donations may have changed the reported numbers.

Aircraft

Current inventory

Retired 
Mikoyan-Gurevich MiG-21, Mikoyan-Gurevich MiG-23, Mikoyan-Gurevich MiG-25, Mikoyan MiG-27, Sukhoi Su-17, Sukhoi Su-15, Yakovlev Yak-28, Tupolev Tu-160, Tupolev Tu-95, Tupolev Tu-22M, Tupolev Tu-22, Tupolev Tu-16, Tupolev Tu-154 and the Tupolev Tu-134.

Armament

Air Defence

Branches of the Air Force

Anti-Aircraft Defense 
The Anti-Aircraft Defense Missile Artillery Forces within the Air Force became predominant after the 2004 merger of the Air Force and the Ukrainian Air Defense Forces. It allowed the Armed Forces of Ukraine to adopt the tri-service structure, common to most modern armed forces in the world.

The Air Defense Missile Forces of the Ukrainian Air Force performs key tasks in the protection of Ukraine's sovereignty and the inviolability of its borders and air space. It has clearly defined functions in both peacetime and wartime, is intended to prevent any enemy air and missile strikes, to defend the most important administrative, political and industrial centers and other vital objects of importance, to aid in the concentration of Army and Navy units, to intercept enemy aircraft and other military objects, and to protect against enemy ballistic and cruise missile strikes.

Structure 
The main task of the air force is the protection of Ukrainian airspace by air and air defense means, aerial reconnaissance, transport of troops and aviation support.

Ukrainian Air Force Command, Vinnytsia

Aviation 

 7th Tactical Aviation Brigade, Starokostiantyniv, Khmelnytskyi Oblast
 15th Transport Aviation Brigade, Kyiv Oblast
 25th Transport Aviation Regiment
 39th Tactical Aviation Brigade
 40th Tactical Aviation Brigade, Vasylkiv, Kyiv Oblast
 114th Tactical Aviation Brigade
 204th Tactical Aviation Brigade
 299th Tactical Aviation Brigade, Mykolaiv Oblast
 383rd Unmanned Aircraft Regiment
 456th Transport Aviation Brigade
 831st Tactical Aviation Brigade, Poltava Oblast

Anti-Aircraft Missile Units 

 11th Anti-Aircraft Missile Regiment
 96th Anti-Aircraft Missile Brigade
 138th Anti-Aircraft Missile Brigade
 156th Anti-Aircraft Missile Regiment
 160th Anti-Aircraft Missile Brigade, Odesa, Odesa Oblast
 201st Anti-Aircraft Missile Brigade
 208th Anti-Aircraft Missile Brigade
 210th Anti-Aircraft Missile Regiment
 223 Anti-Aircraft Missile Regiment
 301st Anti-Aircraft Missile Regiment
 302nd Anti-Aircraft Missile Regiment
 540th Anti-Aircraft Missile Regiment

Radio-Technical Troops 

 1st Radio Technical Brigade
 14th Radio Technical Brigade
 19th Radio Intercept Regiment
 31st Communication Regiment
 43rd Communication Regiment
 57th Communication Regiment
 76th Communication Regiment
 101st Communication Regiment
 138th Radio Technical Brigade
 164th Radio Technical Brigade
 182nd Communication Regiment

Geographic distribution

Military ranks

 Officers

Other Ranks and NCOs

Training
Training activities have taken on a qualitatively new character due to their complexity, including the simultaneous employment of all branches of the Air Force aviation, anti-aircraft artillery and radar troops in close teamwork with units of other armed services of the Armed Forces. Operational and combat training has included the following activities:

 Aviation units have performed more than 6,000 tasks in combat scenarios (including more than 1,500 air battles and interceptions, 629 firing at land-based targets, 530 bombings, 21 launches of air missiles, 454 tasks in aerial surveillance, 454 airborne landings, 740 airlifts, 575 flight shifts for a total of 10,553 flying hours);
 Five tactical flying missions in a squadron, 14 in a pair and 5 in a flight organization have been carried out to perform the assigned combat tasks, and 54 pilots have been trained to perform specific tasks in difficult meteorological conditions;
 The number of flight crews being trained to defend the air space of the country and counter-terrorism air operations has almost doubled from 46 in 2005 to 90 in 2006; the units of anti-aircraft artillery and radar troops carried out 50 maneuvers involving redeployment, with each operator tracking 70 and 140 real and simulated targets, respectively.

In early September 2007, the Ukrainian Air Force conducted the most large-scale training of its aircraft to date. As the Defense Minister of Ukraine, Anatoliy Hrytsenko stated, "The most large-scale, during the whole 16 years of the Ukrainian independence, training of fighting aircraft, which defends our air space, was carried out during September 4–5". According to him, they fulfilled 45 battle launches of air-to-air missile, out of them 22 during the day and 23 at night. 35 pilots confirmed their high skills during the training. Hrytsenko stressed that 100% of air targets were hit.

The Kharkiv State Aircraft Manufacturing Company has developed the KhAZ-30 ultralight trainer for the Ukrainian Airforce. The aircraft is designed for elementary pilot training as an introductory aircraft before recruits move on the more advanced Aero L-39 Albatros trainer.

Invasion of Ukraine

Ukrainian Air Force pilots received specialist training to shoot down cruise missiles. Something that has become important as the war has progress. The same tactics are used for intercepting drones. Pilots using their infrared search and track to detect cruise missiles and drones by their heat signature. They were trained to do this using simulators. Where most cruise missiles fly low and are hard to detect, Russian cruise missiles leave a heat signature from their “conventional two-circuit jet engines”. President Zelenskyy has singled out the 204th Tactical Aviation Brigade for praise in shooting down drones. As surface to air missiles run out the fighters are called upon to do more work.

See also
 Ukrainian Long Range Aviation
 Ukrainian Falcons - aerobatic demonstration team
 Military ranks of Ukraine
 Antonov

Notes

References
 Operation Crimea 2014
 Air Forces Monthly March 1994
 The Ukrainian Army - uarmy.iatp.org.ua
 Analysis of the Ukrainian Security Policy
 Other images from foxbat.ru
 Ukraine as a Post-Cold War Military Power
 Ukrainian Air Force
 Photos from Ukrainian Air Force museum in Kyiv & Poltava
 Upgrading Ukraine’s Air Force could deter Russia

External links

 Air Force page on the official site of Ministry of Defence:
 in Ukrainian
 Photo gallery of the Ukrainian Air Force and Ukrainian Falcons in flight.
 Obsolete 1990-s pennants and patches, Linden Hill imports
 Photos of Ukrainian Air Force 
 .

 
Air Force
Air forces by country
Air Force
1992 establishments in Ukraine
Military units and formations established in 1992